The 2009 Atlantic hurricane season was an event in the annual tropical cyclone season in the north Atlantic Ocean. It was below-average Atlantic hurricane season with nine named storms, the fewest since the 1997 season. The season officially began on June 1, 2009, and ended on November 30, 2009, dates that conventionally delimit the period of each year when most tropical cyclones develop in the Atlantic basin. The first storm to form was Tropical Depression One on May 28, 2009 (one of three in 2009 that did not become a tropical storm), while the last storm, Hurricane Ida, dissipated on November 10.

Of the year's nine named storms, three became hurricanes with two intensifying further into major hurricanes. The inactivity throughout the basin was linked to the formation of an El Niño, which increased wind shear. The two most significant storms of the season, in terms of loss of life and damage, were Hurricanes Bill and Ida. Tropical Storm Claudette was the only storm during 2009 to make landfall in the United States; Hurricane Ida became extratropical shortly before coming ashore in Alabama.

This timeline includes information that was not operationally released, meaning that data from post-storm reviews by the National Hurricane Center, such as a storm that was not operationally warned upon, has been included. This timeline documents tropical cyclone formations, strengthening, weakening, landfalls, extratropical transitions, and dissipations during the season.

By convention, meteorologists use one time zone when issuing forecasts and making observations: Coordinated Universal Time (UTC), and also use the 24-hour clock (where 00:00 = midnight UTC). The National Hurricane Center uses both UTC and the time zone where the center of the tropical cyclone is currently located. The time zones utilized (east to west) prior to 2020 were: Atlantic, Eastern, and Central. In this timeline, all information is listed by UTC first with the respective regional time included in parentheses. Additionally, figures for maximum sustained winds and position estimates are rounded to the nearest 5 units (knots, miles, or kilometers), following the convention used in the National Hurricane Center's products. Direct wind observations are rounded to the nearest whole number. Atmospheric pressures are listed to the nearest millibar and nearest hundredth of an inch of mercury.

Timeline of events

May

May 28
1 a.m.
1 p.m.
May 29
7 p.m.

June
No tropical cyclones formed during the month of June.
June 1
12 a.m. EDT (0400 UTC) – The 2009 Atlantic hurricane season officially begins.

July
No tropical cyclones formed during the month of July, making the 2009 season one of fourteen since 1944 in which no tropical storms developed during June and July.

August

August 11
 2:00 a.m.
August 12
 8:00 a.m. AST (1200 UTC) – Post-season research indicated that at this time, Tropical Depression Two attained tropical storm status. However, as it was not operationally recognized as such, it was not named.
 8:00 p.m. AST (0000 UTC on August 13) – Tropical Storm Ana weakens into a tropical depression.
August 13
 2:00 a.m. AST (0600 UTC) – Tropical Depression Two degenerates into a non-convective remnant low about 775 mi (1,250 km) west of the Cape Verde Islands.
August 14
 8:00 p.m. AST (0000 UTC on August 15) – The remnants of Tropical Depression Two regenerate into a tropical depression roughly 1,075 mi (1,730 km) east of the Lesser Antilles.
August 15
 2:00 a.m. AST (0600 UTC) – Tropical Depression Two strengthens into Tropical Storm Ana.
 2:00 a.m.
 2:00 p.m. AST (1800 UTC) – Tropical Depression Three strengthens into Tropical Storm Bill.
August 16
 1:00 a.m.
 7:00 a.m. EDT (1200 UTC) – Tropical Depression Four strengthens into Tropical Storm Claudette.
 8:00 a.m.
 1:00 p.m.
 7:00 p.m. EDT (0000 UTC on August 17) – Tropical Storm Claudette attains its minimum pressure of 1005 mbar (hPa) just off the Florida coastline.
August 17

 12:30 a.m.
 2:00 a.m. AST (0600 UTC) – Tropical Storm Bill strengthens into a Category 1 hurricane midway between the Lesser Antilles and the Cape Verde Islands.
 7:00 a.m. EDT (1200 UTC) – Tropical Storm Claudette weakens to a tropical depression over Alabama.
 7:00 p.m. EDT (0000 UTC on August 18) – Tropical Depression Claudette dissipates over eastern Mississippi.
 8:00 p.m. AST (0000 UTC on August 18) – Hurricane Bill strengthens to a Category 2 hurricane.
August 18
 2:00 p.m.
August 19
 2:00 a.m.
August 20
 8:00 a.m. AST (1200 UTC) – Hurricane Bill weakens to a Category 3 hurricane.
 8:00 a.m.
August 21
 2:00 p.m. AST (1800 UTC) – Hurricane Bill weakens to a Category 2 hurricane.
August 22

 2:00 a.m.
 2:00 p.m. AST (1800 UTC) – Hurricane Bill weakens to a Category 1 hurricane.
August 23
 2:00 p.m.
 10:00 p.m. AST (0200 UTC on August 24) – Hurricane Bill weakens to a tropical storm just off the southern coast of Newfoundland
 11:00 a.m.
August 24
 8:00 a.m. AST (1200 UTC) – Tropical Storm Bill transitions into an extratropical cyclone over the north Atlantic Ocean as it rapidly tracks eastward towards the United Kingdom.
August 26
 4:00 a.m.
 7:00 p.m.
August 29
 1:00 a.m. EDT (0600 UTC) – Tropical Storm Danny degenerates into a trough of low pressure shortly before being absorbed by a larger low-pressure system.

September
September 1
 2:00 p.m.
 8:00 p.m.
September 2
 2:30 p.m.
September 3
 2:00 p.m. AST (1800 UTC) – Tropical Storm Erika weakens to a tropical depression.
 8:00 p.m. AST (0000 UTC on September 4) – Tropical Depression Erika degenerates into a non-covective remnant low over the eastern Caribbean.

September 7
 2:00 p.m.
 8:00 p.m. AST (0000 UTC on September 8) – Tropical Depression Seven intensifies into Tropical Storm Fred.
September 8
 8:00 p.m. AST (0000 UTC on September 9) – Tropical Storm Fred intensifies into a hurricane, the second of the season.
September 9
 2:00 a.m. AST (0600 UTC) – Hurricane Fred intensifies into a Category 2 hurricane.
 8:00 a.m.
 8:00 p.m. AST (0000 UTC on September 10) – Hurricane Fred weakens to a Category 2 hurricane.
September 10
 2:00 p.m. AST (1800 UTC) – Hurricane Fred weakens to a Category 1 hurricane.
September 11
 2:00 p.m. AST (1800 UTC) – Hurricane Fred weakens to a tropical storm as it stalls northwest of the Cape Verde Islands.
September 12
 2:00 p.m. The remnants of Fred would persist for nearly a week before fully dissipating south of Bermuda on September 19.
September 25
 2:00 p.m.
September 26
 2:00 p.m. AST (1800 UTC) – Tropical Depression Eight degenerates into a remnant low west of the Cape Verde Islands.

October

October 4
 2:00 a.m.
 8:00 p.m.
October 5
 2:00 p.m. AST (1800 UTC) – Tropical Storm Grace attains its minimum pressure of 986 mbar (hPa).
 8:00 p.m. AST (0000 UTC on October 6) – The tenth tropical depression of the season forms roughly 775 mi (1,250 km) east of the Lesser Antilles.
October 6
 2:00 a.m.
 2:00 a.m. AST (0600 UTC) – The tropical depression east of the Lesser Antilles strengthens into Tropical Storm Henri.
October 7
 2:00 a.m.
October 8
 2:00 a.m. AST (0600 UTC) – Tropical Storm Henri weakens to a tropical depression.
 2:00 p.m.

November
November 4
 12:00 a.m. CDT (0600 UTC) – Tropical Depression Eleven forms over the southwestern Caribbean Sea near San Andres Island.
 6:00 a.m. CDT (1200 UTC) – Tropical Depression Eleven intensifies into Tropical Storm Ida.
November 5

 12:00 a.m.
 6:00 a.m.
 12:00 p.m. CDT (1800 UTC) – Hurricane Ida weakens into a tropical storm over the high terrain of Nicaragua.
November 6
 12:00 a.m. CDT (0600 UTC) – Tropical Storm Ida further weakens to a tropical depression as it nears Honduras.
November 7
 12:00 a.m. CDT (0600 UTC) – Tropical Depression Ida restrengthens into a tropical storm after moving over the warm waters of the northwestern Caribbean Sea.
 6:00 p.m. CDT (0000 UTC on November 8) – Tropical Storm Ida regains hurricane status.
November 8
 6:00 a.m. CDT (1200 UTC) – Hurricane Ida intensifies into a Category 2 hurricane.
 12:00 p.m. CDT (1800 UTC) – Hurricane Ida attains its minimum pressure of 975 mbar (hPa).
 6:00 p.m.
November 9
 12:00 a.m. CDT (0600 UTC) – Hurricane Ida weakens to a Category 1 hurricane.
 6:00 a.m. CDT (1200 UTC) – Hurricane Ida quickly weakens to a tropical storm.
 12:00 p.m. CDT (1800 UTC) – Tropical Storm Ida regains hurricane status for a third time.
 3:00 p.m.
 6:00 p.m. CDT (0000 UTC) – Hurricane Ida weakens to a tropical storm as it nears the United States Gulf Coast.
November 10
 3:00 a.m. CDT (0900 UTC) – Tropical Storm Ida transitions into an extratropical cyclone just before moving inland over southern Alabama.
November 30
The 2009 Atlantic hurricane season officially ends.

See also

Lists of Atlantic hurricanes
Timeline of the 2009 Pacific hurricane season

Notes

References

External links
 2009 Tropical Cyclone Advisory Archive, National Hurricane Center and Central Pacific Hurricane Center
 Hurricanes and Tropical Storms – Annual 2009, National Centers for Environmental Information

2009 Atlantic hurricane season
Articles which contain graphical timelines
2009 Atl T